Tsumkwe (Juǀ'Hoan: Tjumǃkui) is a settlement in the Otjozondjupa Region of Namibia and the district capital of the Tsumkwe electoral constituency.

Nature and wildlife
The area associated with Tsumkwe exhibits notable vegetation and wildlife. Particularly within the Khaudom Game Reserve (Kaudwane in Tswana), lions, cheetahs, hyenas and other large mammals can be found. The African wild dog has notable packs within the area.

References

Populated places in the Otjozondjupa Region